Lyndon is the name of several places in the U.S. state of Wisconsin:
Lyndon Station, Wisconsin, a village
Lyndon, Juneau County, Wisconsin, a town
Lyndon, Sheboygan County, Wisconsin, a town